Ponte Alta do Norte is a city in Santa Catarina, in the Southern Region of Brazil. 

On 16 May 2016, a rare tornado hit the city, killing three people and injuring 21 others, while over 100 homes were destroyed or damaged. 95% of Ponte Alta do Norte was left without power.

References

Municipalities in Santa Catarina (state)